Nikos Pantziaras (born January 7, 1954) is a retired Cypriot football midfielder.

Personal
Nikos is the brother of Koulis and Giorgos, and the uncle of Andreas.

References

1954 births
Living people
Cypriot footballers
APOEL FC players
Cyprus international footballers
Association football midfielders